Reference point or similar may refer to:

Mathematics and science
Reference point (physics), used to define a frame of reference
Reference point, a point within a reference range or reference interval, which is a range of values found in healthy persons
Reference point, a measurement taken during a standard state or reference state, used in chemistry to calculate properties under different conditions

Other uses
Reference Point (horse), a 1980s British racehorse
Reference point, a benchmark utility level in prospect theory
Reference Point, a 1990 Acoustic Alchemy album

See also
Benchmark (disambiguation)
Reference (disambiguation)